Sewal de Bovil (died 1258) was a medieval Archbishop of York.

Life

Nothing is known of Bovil's origins or his parents, but he attended Oxford University at around the same time as Edmund of Abingdon, who became Bovil's good friend. He first appears as a canon of York Minster in 1236, and was holding the prebend of Fenton by October 1240. He was Archdeacon of York by January 1248, but had been named Dean of York by 21 September 1249. He earned a doctor of theology title by 1244.

Bovil was archbishop for only two years between 1256 and his death in 1258. He was selected about 1 October 1255 and was consecrated on 23 July 1256, at York by Walter de Cantilupe, Bishop of Worcester. He received a papal dispensation to become archbishop because he was illegitimate on 11 March 1256. Pope Alexander IV then provided Jordan, an Italian, to the now vacant deanery, but Bovil objected and attempted to keep Jordan out. Alexander IV then excommunicated the archbishop in 1257. After a compromise was reached whereby Jordan received a pension, Bovil was absolved. Godfrey Ludham was then promoted to the deanery. In July 1257 he was appointed to a commission to mediate between King Alexander III of Scotland and the Scottish nobles.

The archbishop died on 10 May 1258 and was buried in York Minster. Matthew Paris wrote that he was "a humble and holy man well skilled in law and other sciences."

Citations

References

 
 
 
 
 
  

Alumni of the University of Oxford
People temporarily excommunicated by the Catholic Church
Sewal de Bovil
Archbishops of York
Deans of York
13th-century English Roman Catholic archbishops
Burials at York Minster
Year of birth unknown